Lomo (Spanish for "Hill") is an unincorporated community in Butte County, California.

History
A post office operated at Lomo from 1878 to 1881.

It was previously known Wakefields Station.

References

Unincorporated communities in California
Unincorporated communities in Butte County, California